Bagh is a union council of Abbottabad District in Khyber-Pakhtunkhwa province of Pakistan, it has two high schools GHS Bagh and GMS Kehial The main tribe of this area are the Jadun and the Dhund Abbasis.

Naveed Abbasi PTI U/C Bagh

0300-5614213

Location
It is located in the centre of the district, in the southern part of Abbottabad Tehsil, it is bounded by the following union councils, to the north and east by Dhamtour, to the north by Sarbhana, to the east by Bagnotar, Namli Maira and Nagri Bala - and to the south by Dewal Manal.

Subdivisions
The Union Council is divided into four areas:
Bagh, (Khakhwala ) Kehial and Jaggian Kohalian.

Naveed Abbasi
PTI UC Bagh
0300-5614213

References

Union councils of Abbottabad District